

Distribution

References

0